The Small Cat Conservation Alliance (SCCA) was founded in 1996, to address the conservation needs of small wild cats and their habitat worldwide. Small Cat Conservation Alliance seeks out local scientists and volunteers that are working to protect small cats in remote regions worldwide. They collect data that can be used to seek endangered species classification. SCCA operates in Kalimantan (Borneo), Sumatra, Chile, and China; and works with partners in Argentina, Bolivia, Brazil, Cambodia, India, Sarawak, Suriname and Vietnam. The Small Cat Conservation is also partnered with the Wildlife Conservation Network.

In March 2019, on its website (below) the organization calls itself the Small Wild Cat Conservation Foundation.

Species
Out of the 36 feline species, 22 are considered small cat species. The primary priority species that SCCA addresses include:

 African wildcat (Felis silvestris lybica)
 Andean mountain cat (Leopardus jacobita)
 Bornean bay cat (Pardofelis badia)
 Chinese mountain cat (Felis bieti)
 Fishing cat (Prionailurus viverrinus)
 Flat-headed cat (Prionailurus planiceps)
 Guigna (Leopardus guigna)
 Leopard cat (Prionailurus bengalensis)
 Marbled cat (Pardofelis marmorata)
 Margay (Leopardus wiedii)
 Rusty-spotted cat (Prionailurus rubiginosus)

Programs

Camera traps
Cameras are set up to photograph anything that passes in the area to gain information of the population, behaviors and activities of small cats and those that share their territory. In 2007 SCCA captured the first photograph of a Chinese mountain cat in the wild.

Radio collars
Small cats are fitted with radio collars to help study their range and behaviors including contact with humans.

Local resources
Local conservationists and scientists are sought after for conservation planning of targeted species and their habitat.

See also

 Conservation movement
 Natural environment

References

Further reading

External links

 smallcats.org Small Cat Conservation Alliance Website
 wildnet.org, Wildlife Conservation Network Website

Conservation projects
Endangered species
International environmental organizations
Organizations established in 1996
Cat conservation organizations